Simplicissimus is also a name for the 1668 novel Simplicius Simplicissimus and its protagonist.
Simplicissimus was a satirical German weekly magazine, headquartered in Munich, and founded by Albert Langen in April 1896. It continued publishing until 1967, interrupted by a hiatus from 1944–1954, and became a biweekly in 1964. It took its name from the protagonist of Grimmelshausen's 1668 novel Der Abenteuerliche Simplicissimus Teutsch.

Combining brash and politically daring content, with a bright, immediate, and surprisingly modern graphic style, Simplicissimus published the work of writers such as Thomas Mann and Rainer Maria Rilke. Its most reliable targets for caricature were stiff Prussian military figures, and rigid German social and class distinctions as seen from the more relaxed, liberal atmosphere of Munich. Contributors included Hermann Hesse, Gustav Meyrink, Fanny zu Reventlow, Jakob Wassermann, Frank Wedekind, Heinrich Kley, Alfred Kubin, Otto Nückel, Robert Walser, Heinrich Zille, Hugo von Hofmannsthal, Heinrich Mann, Lessie Sachs, and Erich Kästner.

Although the magazine's satirical nature was largely indulged by the German government, an 1898 cover mocking Kaiser Wilhelm's pilgrimage to Palestine resulted in the issue being confiscated. Langen, the publisher, spent five years' exile in Switzerland and was fined 30,000 German gold marks. A six-month prison sentence was given to the cartoonist Heine, and seven months to the writer Frank Wedekind. All the defendants were charged with "insulting a royal majesty". Again in 1906 the editor Ludwig Thoma was imprisoned for six months for attacking the clergy. These controversies only served to increase circulation, which peaked at about 85,000 copies. Upon Germany's entry into World War I, the weekly dulled its satirical tone, began supporting the war effort and considered closing down. Thereafter, the strongest political satire expressed in graphics became the province of artists George Grosz and Käthe Kollwitz (who were both contributors) and John Heartfield.

The editor Ludwig Thoma joined the army in a medical unit in 1917, and lost his taste for satire, denouncing his previous work at the magazine, calling it immature and deplorable.

During the Weimar era the magazine continued to publish and took a strong stand against extremists on the left and on the right. (A satirical gallery of cartoons posing the question "What Does Hitler Look Like?" was published on the second page of its 5-28-1923 issue, as there were then no publicly available photographs of Adolf Hitler.) As the National Socialists gradually came to power, they issued verbal accusations, attacks, threats and personal intimidation against the artists and writers of Simplicissimus, but they did not ban it. The editor Thomas Theodor Heine, a Jew, was forced to resign and went into exile. Other members of the team, including Karl Arnold, Olaf Gulbransson, Edward Thöny, Erich Schilling and Wilhelm Schulz remained and toed the Nazi party line, for which they were rewarded by the Nazis. The magazine adopted an aggressive satirical approach towards the Jews during this period in line with the Nazi magazine Die Brennessel. Simplicissimus continued publishing, in declining form, until finally ceasing publication in 1944. It was revived from 1954–1967.

Other graphic artists associated with the magazine included Bruno Paul, Josef Benedikt Engl, Rudolf Wilke, Ferdinand von Reznicek, Joseph Sattler, and Jeanne Mammen.

Gallery

See also

 Bauhaus
 Gesamtkunstwerk
 List of magazines in Germany
 Jugend (magazine)
 Jugendstil
Pan (magazine)
 Secession (art)
 Ulenspiegel

Notes

External links

 Simplicissimus.info: Digital archive of back issues from 1896–1944 
 An academic appreciation of several of its notable illustrators
 What Does Hitler Look Like? A satirical gallery from the 5-28-23 105-116 issue, early in Hitler's political career, when there were no publicly available photographs

1896 establishments in Germany
1967 disestablishments in West Germany
Defunct magazines published in Germany
Visual arts magazines published in Germany
Satirical magazines published in Germany
Weekly magazines published in Germany
Magazines established in 1896
Magazines disestablished in 1967
Magazines published in Munich
Weimar culture
Biweekly magazines published in Germany